Michael I. Karpin (Hebrew מיכאל קרפין, born on 29 November 1945) is an Israeli broadcast journalist and author, best known for his investigative documentaries and books, revealing two of Israel's most concealed affairs: The creation of the country's nuclear capability and the nationalistic-messianic incitement campaign that preceded the assassination of Prime Minister Yitzhak Rabin. In May 1986, Karpin broke the story of Israel's secret service (Shabak) fabrication of evidence in the course of Bus Line 300's investigation, one of the most controversial political affairs in the history of the country.  In 1987, he exposed the Izat Nafsu Affair: a Moslem  IDF officer and a Circassian (a small ethnic minority in Israel), who was maliciously investigated by the secret service, convicted of spying and eventually exonerated by the Supreme Court. Karpin is married to Pnina (née Bahat), has 3 grownup children and lives in Tel Aviv.

Karpin had studied political science in the Hebrew University and mass communication in UCLA. He entered broadcasting in 1969, as a radio news reporter for The Voice of Israel (Kol Israel) and became one of the top Israeli reporters of the 1973's Yom Kippur War, covering some of the most ferocious engagements at the Southern Front and the following Disengagement Talks at "Kilometer 101" and then at Geneva, Switzerland. In 1976 he joined the Israeli Television's (Channel One today, which until 1986 was the sole television channel in the country) news department and for twenty years served as senior reporter and editor. From 1976 to 1980, Karpin was stationed in Bonn, West Germany, functioning as chief European correspondent. In 1983, he became editor in chief of his cannel's evening news (Mabat) and then, from 1986 to 1991, produced and hosted Channel One's flagship program, Second Look, specializing in investigative reporting. Between May 1991 and November 1992, he was stationed in Moscow, becoming the first independent Israeli journalist to be accredited by the Soviet Union (between 1967 and 1991, diplomatic relations between the two countries were ruptured and thereat only messengers of Israel's communist party daily were accredited by Moscow). In 1995, upon leaving Channel One, Karpin headed the group that won the bid for Radio 103 FM for Greater Tel Aviv, the first private station that was established in Israel. He had built the station from scratch and after managing it for one year left to become an independent documentary producer and writer of investigative books, intended mainly for the American market.

Karpin's documentaries
A Bomb in the Basement (2001) tells for the first time in television the story of the creation of Dimona's reactor and the development of Israel's nuclear option. It has been screened by television networks, international film festivals and professional conferences worldwide.

The Road to Rabin Square (1997) exposes the rude incitement campaign against PM Yitzhak Rabin prior to his assassination. It won a jury Special Recognition at the 1998 Biarritz FIPA Festival and a silver medal at the 1997 NY Festival for International Television Programming and Promotion. It was screened by TV networks in 15 countries and many international film festivals.

Distant Relatives (1995), a three-chapter series portraying the Jewish community in North America, was awarded the B'nai B'rith World Center Award for Journalism.

Karpin's books
Imperfect Compromise: A New Consensus among Israelis and Palestinians (Potomac Books – University of Nebraska Press, 2013) – An entirely different thesis from that of most books about the Middle East peace settlement: The forces opposed to a peace settlement are weakening, public opinion is more open to compromise than the leaders are, and the principles of a final settlement have been developed. Now the question is whether and when the leaders on both sides will be capable of overcoming the fanatical minorities that torpedo each attempt to arrive at a peace agreement.

The Bomb in the Basement – How Israel Went Nuclear and What That Means to the World (Simon & Schuster, NY, 2006) tells how Israel became the Middle East's only nuclear power and how it succeeded in keeping its atomic program secret.

Murder in the Name of God (co-author Ina Friedman) depicts the setting up of the incitement campaign against Yitzhak Rabin's firm decision to negotiate peace-for-territories with the Palestinian Authority and portraits the individuals responsible for the PM's assassination. The book had been published by Henry Holt and Company, New-York (1998); Rowohlt, Hamburg (1998); Granta Books, London (1999); Zmora-Bitan, Tel-Aviv (1999).

Tightrope – Six Centuries of a Jewish Dynasty (John Wiley & Sons, NY, 2008) is an historical saga of the extraordinary Backenroth family from Galicia (today in western Ukraine) – a true story based on diaries, letters, documents, and oral testimony. In its broad outlines, the history of the Backenroths is similar to the history of most of the European Jewish families that migrated to the United States.

Books in Hebrew
Metamorphosis in the Snow (Domino, Jerusalem, 1983) presents an artistic illustration of the complicated and loaded relationship between Germans and Jews.

Notes from Pushkin Square (Yedioth Ahronoth, Tel Aviv, 1993) depicts Karpin's experiences in Moscow during the Soviet Empire's collapse.

Other documentaries
"Jerusalem is Full of Used Jews" (2006) views Yehuda Amichai's poems of Jerusalem from a new artistic and political perspective.

"I Can't Take It Any More" (2006) displays Prime Minister Menachem Begin's sorrowful last years of life, from his 1981's decision to bomb Iraq's Osiraq nuclear reactor, through the controversial First Lebanon War, his sudden resignation from the Prime Ministry and his nine years of solitary, when he imprisoned himself in a small flat in Jerusalem.

References

External links
 Karpin's website
 Karpin's Amazon page

1945 births
Israeli Jews
Living people
Israeli non-fiction writers
Israeli journalists
Hebrew University of Jerusalem Faculty of Social Sciences alumni
People from Tel Aviv